The 2013 Leinster Senior Football Championship was that year's installment of the annual Leinster Senior Football Championship held under the auspices of the Leinster GAA.

It was won by Dublin who defeated Meath in the final. This was Dublin's 52nd Leinster title. Their defeat of Kildare in the semi-final was their biggest Championship win over the team since 1897.

The winning Dublin team received the Delaney Cup, and automatically advanced to the quarter-final stage of the 2013 All-Ireland Senior Football Championship. They progressed to the 2013 All-Ireland Senior Football Championship Final. Meath entered the All-Ireland qualifiers, and were defeated by Tyrone in their next game.

Bracket

Quarterfinals

Semi-finals

Final

References

External links
 Leinster GAA website

2L
Leinster Senior Football Championship